Mavis Beacon Teaches Typing is an application software program designed to teach touch typing.

History 
The typing program was initially released in late 1987 by The Software Toolworks and has been published regularly ever since. The first version written for MS-DOS was created by Norm Worthington, Walt Bilofsky, and Mike Duffy.  Editions of Mavis Beacon are currently published by Encore Software (hybrid Mac and Windows) and Software MacKiev (macOS only) and are available throughout the retail sales world.  An early version supported both QWERTY and the alternative Dvorak Simplified Keyboard layout. Later versions supported only QWERTY until the 2011 Ultimate Mac Edition from Software MacKiev which returned full Dvorak keyboard lessons to the product.  Earlier versions were made for Apple II, Commodore 64, Atari 8-bit family (version 1 only), Apple IIGS, Atari ST, Mac OS, Microsoft Windows, Palm OS (version 16), and Amiga. The current Windows and Mac versions are published under the Broderbund trademark by both Encore and Software MacKiev.

Features 
The program includes a number of speed tests and constantly tracks the user's words-per-minute typing speed. It also includes a number of typing games of which some versions have been included since the first release. (The 2011 Ultimate Mac Edition for macOS, published by Software MacKiev, also includes two-player competitive typing network games, integration with iTunes, Dvorak keyboard support, practice typing song lyrics, RSS news feeds and classic novels.)  A certificate of achievement can be printed by the user upon the completion of tests.

Name 

Mavis Beacon is not a real person. The original photo of Mavis Beacon was of Haitian-born model Renee L'Esperance. She was introduced to Les Crane, the former talk-show host, while he was shopping at Saks Fifth Avenue in Beverly Hills. Crane, who was then a partner in The Software Toolworks, devised the sobriquet.

Mavis Beacon's first name was taken from Mavis Staples, lead vocalist for the Staple Singers. The surname derives from beacon, as in a light to guide the way.

Reception
Mavis Beacon Teaches Typing

A favorable review in 1987 by Peter Lewis, technology writer for The New York Times, gave the program an early boost. Compute! favorably reviewed the program in 1989, stating that children, adults, and experienced typists would find it useful, and citing its support of Dvorak training. The Washington Post felt the product "conceals the typing drills rather nicely behind a game".

Mavis Beacon Teaches Typing II

Paul Tyrrell for Amiga Format wrote that the program was well researched, well written, and easy to use. Nick Veitch for CU Amiga felt the product was much more interesting than other educational multimedia products.

Mavis Beacon Teaches Typing Version 5

Superkids described it as a "well-polished program".

Mavis Beacon Teaches Typing For Kids

Metzo Magic appreciated that the game had only few Americanised words, which increased the game's appeal in areas that use British spelling.

Mavis Beacon Teaches Typing Version 9

The New York Times noted that by 1999, although the product was not the "flashiest" option for players, it remained an effective typing program.

Sales 
By 1999, the series had sold over six million copies.

On April 21, 2000, two products reached the Top Selling Educational Software list: Mavis Beacon Teaches Typing 10.0 (4th) and Mavis Beacon Teaches Typing 5.0 (8th).

See also 

 Typequick

References

External links
 Mavis Beacon Teaches Typing by Encore (Windows and Mac editions)
 Mavis Beacon Teaches Typing by Software MacKiev (Mac OS X edition)

1987 video games
Amiga games
Apple II games
Apple IIGS games
Atari ST games
Children's educational video games
Classic Mac OS games
Encore Software games
The Software Toolworks games
Typing software
Typing video games
Video games developed in the United States
Windows games